Alfred Rowland (2 September 1920 – 1997) was an English professional footballer who played as a defender. He made 96 appearances in the Football League during spells with Aldershot and Cardiff City.

Early life
During World War II, Rowland served in the Middle East with the Green Howards. He was captured and served four years as a prisoner of war.

Career
Following the end of World War II, Rowland began his professional career with Aldershot where he made 93 appearances in the Football League. In 1949, he signed for Cardiff City for a fee of £10,500, a club record for Aldershot. However, he struggled to establish himself in the first team at Cardiff, making only three appearances as injury cover for Fred Stansfield, before dropping out of professional football.

References

1920 births
1997 deaths
Green Howards soldiers
British World War II prisoners of war
British Army personnel of World War II
English footballers
Aldershot F.C. players
Cardiff City F.C. players
English Football League players
Association football defenders
Military personnel from Yorkshire